Alecto motorcycles were manufactured between 1919 and 1925 in London by Whitmee Engineering.
A chain-driven 345cc model was built between 1923 and 1924.

References

External links
1923 Sports model

Motorcycle manufacturers of the United Kingdom